Hockerill Halt railway station was a station serving the Hockerill area of Bishop's Stortford in East Hertfordshire in England.

Services began on 7 November 1910 and ended on 3 March 1952.

The station along with almost all the intermediate stations on the Bishop's Stortford-Braintree branch were little used. The station is extremely close to the Main line station Bishops Stortford. It was built to serve the Bishop's Stortford Golf Club but it was also open to the public.

It closed to passengers along with the rest of the branch.

The halt consisted of a low platform of made up ground, with telephone access to the signalman at Bishops Stortford.

It was partially restored in 2012 by the Friends of the Flitch Way - however this was not evident when visited in 2019.

References

Further reading

 

Disused railway stations in Hertfordshire
Former Great Eastern Railway stations
Railway stations in Great Britain opened in 1910
Railway stations in Great Britain closed in 1952
Bishop's Stortford